The index of physics articles is split into multiple pages due to its size.

To navigate by individual letter use the table of contents below.

G

G-factor (physics)
G-force
G-parity
G. B. Pegram
G. C. Danielson
G. M. B. Dobson
G. Michael Morris
G. Michael Purdy
G. N. Glasoe
G. N. Ramachandran
G. V. Skrotskii
G. W. Pierce
GALLEX
GEANT (program)
GEKKO XII
GENERIC formalism
GEOBASE (database)
GEO 600
GHP formalism
GHZ experiment
GIM mechanism
GLEEP
GLORIA sidescan sonar
GRAPES-3
GRENOUILLE
GROMACS
GROMOS
GRS 1915+105
GRTensorII
GSI Helmholtz Centre for Heavy Ion Research
GSI anomaly
GSO projection
GW approximation
GYRO
Gabriel Gabrielsen Holtsmark
Gabriel Lippmann
Gabriele Rabel
Gabriele Veneziano
Gabrio Piola
Gadolinium yttrium garnet
Gaetano Crocco
Gaetano Vignola
Gain-switching
Gaja Alaga
Gal (unit)
Galactic archaeology
Galactic cosmic ray
Galaxy cloud
Galaxy filament
Galaxy formation and evolution
Galaxy merger
Galaxy rotation curve
Galilean cannon
Galilean invariance
Galilean transformation
Galilei number
Galileo's Leaning Tower of Pisa experiment
Galileo Ferraris
Galileo Galilei
Galileo thermometer
Gallium arsenide phosphide
Gallium indium arsenide antimonide phosphide
Galvanoluminescence
Galvanometer
Gamma-ray astronomy
Gamma-ray burst
Gamma-ray burst emission mechanisms
Gamma-ray burst progenitors
Gamma camera
Gamma counter
Gamma matrices
Gamma ray
Gamma spectroscopy
Gamow-Teller Transition
Gamow factor
Ganapathy Baskaran
Gans theory
Gareth Roberts (physicist)
Gargamelle
Garrett Jernigan
Garshelis effect
Gary Bold
Gary C. Bjorklund
Gary Gibbons
Gary L. Bennett
Gary S. Grest
Gary Westfall
Gas
Gas-discharge lamp
Gas-filled tube
Gas-phase ion chemistry
Gas Electron Multiplier
Gas centrifuge
Gas compressor
Gas constant
Gas discharge
Gas dynamic laser
Gas dynamics
Gas focusing
Gas immersion laser doping
Gas in a box
Gas in a harmonic trap
Gas laser
Gas laws
Gas thermometer
Gaseous diffusion
Gaseous ionization detectors
Gaspar Schott
Gaspard-Gustave Coriolis
Gasparo Berti
Gaston Planté
Gauge anomaly
Gauge boson
Gauge fixing
Gauge gravitation theory
Gauge symmetry
Gauge symmetry (mathematics)
Gauge theory
Gauged supergravity
Gaugino
Gaugino condensation
Gaunt factor
Gauss' law
Gauss' law for magnetism
Gauss's law
Gauss's law for gravity
Gauss's law for magnetism
Gauss's principle of least constraint
Gauss lens
Gauss optics
Gaussian beam
Gaussian broadening
Gaussian fixed point
Gaussian gravitational constant
Gaussian noise
Gaussian orbital
Gaussian polar coordinates
Gaussian q-distribution
Gaussian quantum Monte Carlo
Gaussian surface
Gaussian units
Gauss–Codazzi equations (relativity)
Gay-Lussac's law
Gaylord Harnwell
Geant4
Geertruida de Haas-Lorentz
Geiger counter
Geiger tube telescope
Geiger–Marsden experiment
Geiger–Müller tube
Geiger–Nuttall law
Geissler tube
Gel
Gell-Mann matrices
Gell-Mann–Nishijima formula
Gell-Mann–Okubo mass formula
Gene Amdahl
General Relativity (book)
General Relativity and Gravitation
General covariance
General relativity
General relativity resources
Generalized Environmental Modeling System for Surfacewaters
Generalized Helmholtz theorem
Generalized Lagrangian mean
Generalized Maxwell model
Generalized Newtonian fluid
Generalized coordinates
Generalized valence bond
Generating function (physics)
Generation (particle physics)
Generation–recombination noise
Generator (mathematics)
Geneva drive
Gennadi Sardanashvily
Gennadi Zakharov
Gennady Mesyats
Geocentric model
Geocentric orbit
Geodesic
Geodesic deviation equation
Geodesics as Hamiltonian flows
Geodesics in general relativity
Geodetic effect
Geoff Wilson (professor)
Geoffrey Chew
Geoffrey Ingram Taylor
Geoffrey Thomas
Geoffrey West
Geoid
Geomagnetic jerk
Geomagnetic latitude
Geomagnetic pole
Geomagnetic storm
Geomechanics
Geomelting
Geometric algebra
Geometric phase
Geometric quantization
Geometrical frustration
Geometrically frustrated magnet
Geometrized unit system
Geometrodynamics
Geon (physics)
Geonium atom
Geophysical Journal International
Geophysical Journal of the Royal Astronomical Society
Geophysical MASINT
Geophysical fluid dynamics
Geophysical survey (archaeology)
Geophysics
Geopotential
Geopotential function
Geopotential model
Georg Adolf Erman
Georg Christoph Lichtenberg
Georg Hartmann
Georg Hermann Quincke
Georg Joos
Georg Ohm
Georg Stetter
Georg Wilhelm Richmann
Georg Zundel
Georg von Arco
Georg von Békésy
George Adams (scientist, died 1773)
George Adams (scientist, died 1795)
George Adolphus Schott
George Bacon (physicist)
George Barker Jeffery
George Bass (optician)
George Batchelor
George Blumenthal (astrophysicist)
George Chapline, Jr.
George Cowan
George David Birkhoff
George Dollond
George E. Smith
George Edward Alcorn, Jr.
George Edward Backus
George Eleftheriades
George F. Carrier
George FitzGerald
George Francis Rayner Ellis
George Gamow
George Gollin
George Graham (clockmaker)
George Green (mathematician)
George H. Miller (physicist)
George Handley Knibbs
George Hart (physicist)
George Hockham
George Irving Bell
George Isaak
George Johnstone Stoney
George K. Burgess
George Kalmus
George Karreman
George Kistiakowsky
George Laurence
George M. Zaslavsky
George N. Hatsopoulos
George Nelson (astronaut)
George Paget Thomson
George Pake
George Placzek
George R. Harrison
George Randolph Kalbfleisch
George Robert Carruthers
George Rochester
George Smoot
George Sterman
George Sudarshan
George Turner (British politician)
George Uhlenbeck
George V. Eleftheriades
George Volkoff
George W. Clark
George W. Lewis
George Weston (physicist)
George Wetherill
George Willis Ritchey
George Yuri Rainich
George Zweig
Georges-Louis Le Sage
Georges Abrial
Georges Charpak
Georges Friedel
Georges Lemaître
Georges Sagnac
Georgi Dvali
Georgi Manev
Georgi Nadjakov
Georgi Nadzhakoff
Georgiy Zatsepin
Georgi–Glashow model
Georgi–Jarlskog mass relation
Georgy Flyorov
Georgy Golitsyn
Geosphere
Geostationary orbit
Geostationary ring
Geostationary transfer orbit
Geostrophic wind
Geothermal energy
Geothermal heat pump
Geraint F. Lewis
Gerald B. Cleaver
Gerald B. Whitham
Gerald Bull
Gerald E. Brown
Gerald Feinberg
Gerald Gabrielse
Gerald Guralnik
Gerald Holton
Gerald James Whitrow
Gerald Neugebauer
Gerald Schroeder
Gerard 't Hooft
Gerard K. O'Neill
Gerardus J. Sizoo
Gerd Binnig
Gerhard Borrmann
Gerhard Heinrich Dieke
Gerhard Herzberg
Gerhard Hoffmann
Gerhard Müller (geophysicist)
Gerhard Schwehm
German Geophysical Society
Gernot Zippe
Geroch energy
Geroch group
Gerotor
Gerrit Jan van Ingen Schenau
Gersh Budker
Gerson Goldhaber
Gerstein Science Information Centre
Gerstenhaber algebra
Gertrude Neumark
Gertrude Rogallo
Gertrude Scharff Goldhaber
Ghirardi–Rimini–Weber theory
Ghost condensate
Ghost imaging
Ghulam Murtaza (physicist)
Giambattista Benedetti
Gian-Carlo Wick
Gian Domenico Romagnosi
Giant magnetoresistance
Giant resonance
Gibbons–Hawking effect
Gibbons–Hawking–York boundary term
Gibbs' phase rule
Gibbs algorithm
Gibbs entropy
Gibbs free energy
Gibbs measure
Gibbs paradox
Gibbs state
Gibbs–Donnan effect
Gibbs–Helmholtz equation
Gibbs–Thomson equation
Gilbert Jerome Perlow
Gilbert N. Lewis
Gilbert Ronald Bainbridge
Gilbert Stead
Gilbert U-238 Atomic Energy Laboratory
Gilles Cloutier
Gimbal lock
Gino Girolamo Fanno
Ginsberg's theorem
Ginzburg–Landau theory
Giorgio Parisi
Giovanni Aldini
Giovanni Alfonso Borelli
Giovanni Amelino-Camelia
Giovanni Antonio Amedeo Plana
Giovanni Battista Beccaria
Giovanni Battista Guglielmini
Giovanni Battista Venturi
Giovanni Ciccotti
Giovanni Gallavotti
Giovanni Giorgi
Giovanni Jona-Lasinio
Giovanni Poleni
Giovanni Rossi Lomanitz
Gires–Tournois etalon
Girish Agarwal
Gisela Anton
Giuliano Preparata
Giulio Racah
Giuseppe Arcidiacono
Giuseppe Cocconi
Giuseppe Domenico Botto
Giuseppe Occhialini
Giuseppe Toaldo
Giuseppe Zamboni
Giuseppe di Giugno
Gladstone–Dale relation
Gladys Anslow
Glan–Foucault prism
Glan–Taylor prism
Glan–Thompson prism
Glass transition
Glass transition temperature
Glass with embedded metal and sulfides
Glasser effect
Glauber–Sudarshan P representation
Gleason's theorem
Gleb Wataghin
Glenn T. Seaborg
Glidant
Glide plane
Glider (sailplane)
Gliding
Glitch (astronomy)
Global Convection Currents
Global Design Effort
Global Lorentz covariance
Global anomaly
Global spacetime structure
Global symmetry
Globally hyperbolic manifold
Globe effect
Glossary of classical physics
Glossary of elementary quantum mechanics
Glossary of physics
Glossary of string theory
Glossary of tensor theory
Glow discharge
GlueX
Glueball
Gluino
Gluon
Gluon condensate
God and the New Physics
Goddard–Thorn theorem
Godfrey Gumbs
Godfrey Louis
Godunov's scheme
Godunov's theorem
Goetz Oertel
Goff–Gratch equation
Gold universe
Goldberger–Wise mechanism
Goldberg–Sachs theorem
Golden Goose Award
Golden age of cosmology
Golden age of general relativity
Golden age of physics
Goldsmiths' Professor of Materials Science
Goldstino
Goldstone boson
Goniometer
Good quantum number
Goodman relation
Goodness factor
Goos–Hänchen effect
Gopinath Kartha
Gordon F. Newell
Gordon Ferrie Hull
Gordon Gould
Gordon L. Kane
Gordon Research Conferences
Gordon Shrum
Gordon Sutherland
Gotfred Kvifte
Gottfried Münzenberg
Gottfried Osann
Gottfried Wilhelm Leibniz
Gotthilf Hagen
Gough–Joule effect
Gouy balance
Gowdy solution
Gowin Knight
Goéry Delacôte
Graded-index fiber
Gradient
Gradient enhanced NMR spectroscopy
Gradient theorem
Gradiometer
Graetz number
Graham's law
Grain boundary diffusion coefficient
Grand Accélérateur National d'Ions Lourds
Grand Unified Theory
Grand canonical ensemble
Grand potential
Grand unification energy
Grand unification epoch
Grandfather paradox
Grant O. Gale
Granular convection
Granular material
Granularity
Granule (solar physics)
Graphene
Graphene nanoribbons
Graphical timeline from Big Bang to Heat Death
Graphical timeline of the Big Bang
Graphical timeline of the Stelliferous Era
Graphical timeline of the universe
Grashof condition
Grashof number
Grassmann integral
Grassmann number
Gravastar
Gravimeter
Gravimetry
Graviphoton
Graviscalar
Gravitation
Gravitation (book)
Gravitational-wave astronomy
Gravitational-wave detector
Gravitational Wave International Committee
Gravitational acceleration
Gravitational anomaly
Gravitational binding energy
Gravitational collapse
Gravitational constant
Gravitational convection
Gravitational energy
Gravitational field
Gravitational instanton
Gravitational interaction of antimatter
Gravitational lens
Gravitational lensing formalism
Gravitational microlensing
Gravitational mirage
Gravitational plane wave
Gravitational potential
Gravitational redshift
Gravitational shielding
Gravitational singularity
Gravitational time dilation
Gravitational wave
Gravitational wave background
Gravitino
Gravitoelectromagnetism
Gravitomagnetic clock effect
Graviton
Gravity Probe A
Gravity Probe B
Gravity Recovery and Climate Experiment
Gravity Research Foundation
Gravity and Extreme Magnetism SMEX
Gravity anomaly
Gravity assist
Gravity current
Gravity drag
Gravity gradiometry
Gravity of Earth
Gravity train
Gravity wave
Gravity well
Gray (unit)
Grazing incidence diffraction
Great Dark Spot
Greek letters used in mathematics, science, and engineering
Green's function (many-body theory)
Green's theorem
Green flash
Greenberger–Horne–Zeilinger state
Greenleaf Whittier Pickard
Green–Kubo relations
Green–Schwarz mechanism
Greg Moore (physicist)
Greg Parker (physicist)
Gregale
Gregor Wentzel
Gregori Aminoff Prize
Gregorian telescope
Gregory Benford
Gregory Breit
Gregory Gabadadze
Gregory S. Boebinger
Gregory Stock
Gregory Wannier
Gregory Wright (astrophysicist)
Gregory–Laflamme instability
Greisen–Zatsepin–Kuzmin limit
Grenville Turner
Gretar Tryggvason
Grey noise
Gribov ambiguity
GridPP
Grid fin
Grigory Barenblatt
Grigory Gamburtsev
Grigory Landsberg
Grism
Gromov–Witten invariant
Gross generation
Gross–Neveu model
Gross–Pitaevskii equation
Grote Reber
Grotthuss–Draper law
Ground (electricity)
Ground effect (aircraft)
Ground effect (cars)
Ground pressure
Ground resonance
Ground state
Groundwater energy balance
Group field theory
Group velocities
Group velocity
Grover's algorithm
Grüneisen parameter
Gu Binglin
Guenter Brueckner
Guglielmo Marconi
Guided-mode resonance
Guided rotor compressor
Guiding center
Guido Beck
Guido Caldarelli
Guifré Vidal
Guillaume Amontons
Gull wing
Gullstrand–Painlevé coordinates
Gun-type fission weapon
Gunn diode
Gunnar Källén
Gunnar Nordström
Gunnar Randers
Gunn–Peterson trough
Guo Kexin
Gupta–Bleuler formalism
Gurgen Askaryan
Gurney flap
Gustaf Dalén
Gustaf de Laval
Gustav Heinrich Johann Apollon Tammann
Gustav Heinrich Wiedemann
Gustav Herglotz
Gustav Ising
Gustav Jaumann
Gustav Kirchhoff
Gustav Ludwig Hertz
Gustav Mie
Gustav Naan
Gustav Zeuner
Gustav de Vries
Gustave-Adolphe Hirn
Gustave Trouvé
Guy Deutscher (physicist)
Guy von Dardel
Gwyn Jones (physicist)
Gyration tensor
Gyrokinetic ElectroMagnetic
Gyromagnetic ratio
Gyroradius
Gyroscope
Gyrovector space
Gyula Farkas (natural scientist)
György Szigeti
Gérard Mourou
Gödel metric
Görtler vortices
Göttingen Eighteen
Günter Nimtz
Günther Dollinger
Günther Porod

Indexes of physics articles